Bernard "Bunny" Wadsworth was an all-star and Grey Cup champion Canadian football lineman. Playing in the early days of the Ottawa Rough Riders, before the Canadian Football League was formed, Wadsworth's career spanned eight seasons, and included three all-star selections and the 1940 Grey Cup championship. He was honored as a member of the Rough Rider "Half Century" team.

He and his wife Catherine (née Kehoe) had six children, one of whom was Michael "Mike" Wadsworth, Canadian football player, lawyer, businessman, sports analyst and Canadian Ambassador to the Republic of Ireland.

References

Canadian football defensive linemen
Canadian football offensive linemen
Ottawa Rough Riders players
Place of birth missing
Year of birth missing
Place of death missing
Year of death missing